Taiwani bialbipuncta is a moth of the family Erebidae first described by Michael Fibiger in 2008. It is known from Taiwan and eastern China.

Adults have been found in April, June and September. There are probably several generations per year.

The wingspan is 12–16 mm. The forewing is relatively narrow and yellowish and the reniform stigma is hardly traceable. The crosslines are mostly absent, except for the terminal line, which is marked by small black interveinal spots. The antemedian and postmedian lines are marked only at the costa. The hindwing is light greyish brown with an indistinct discal spot. The underside of the upper forewing is part brownish, but otherwise grey brown and without a pattern. The underside of the upper hindwing is part brownish, but the lower part is light grey, with a discal spot

References

Micronoctuini
Moths described in 2008